Gillian Louise Kearney (born 9 May 1972, in Liverpool) is an English actress best known for her early role as Debbie McGrath in Channel 4's Liverpool-based soap opera Brookside and the spin-off mini-series Damon and Debbie, and for playing Jessica Harrison in the long-running BBC television medical drama series Casualty, as well as Emma Barton in the ITV Yorkshire-based soap opera Emmerdale. The role of Emma gained her recognition because of character's involvement in Emmerdale’s most high-profile storylines during her three-year stint.

Early life
One of four children born to Gerard and Barbara (née Allerston) Kearney, Kearney has three brothers, including Tom, a professional footballer. Her father is a retired civil engineer, and her mother a school care worker. Growing up in Aigburth, she attended St. John Almond RC High School, Garston, where she gained nine GCSEs and four A-levels. She later trained at the Rose Bruford College.

Career
Her interest in acting began at secondary school. After repeatedly being overlooked for the lead roles in school productions, she decided to join the Liverpool Playhouse Youth Theatre, where she featured in plays including All Flesh is Grass (as Ema), Katie Crackernuts and Yer Dancin'? It was there, in 1986, that she was spotted by members of the Mersey Television production team; this resulted in her being asked to audition for a role in Channel 4's soap opera Brookside. Kearney landed the role of Debbie McGrath, the girlfriend of Damon Grant, played by Simon O'Brien. When O'Brien decided to leave Brookside, he requested that his character be killed off so he wouldn't be tempted to return to the show. Because Damon was so popular, particularly with younger viewers, it was decided to create a "soap bubble" in which the character would meet his demise: the result, Damon and Debbie, became Britain's first mini-series spin-off from a soap opera. A year after filming her final scenes, Kearney was asked to return for a few episodes. Christmas 1988 saw Debbie McGrath make an unexpected return to visit Sheila Grant, Damon's mother; she arrived with her baby, Simon – Damon's son.

Kearney played the young Shirley in the award-winning 1989 film Shirley Valentine.

She also had the lead female part as Ellie Brookes in Sex, Chips & Rock n' Roll, a six-part television mini-series written and created by Debbie Horsfield and directed by John Woods. It was produced by Wall to Wall for BBC One originally airing in 1999 before being adapted into a successful stage musical.

In 2002, Kearney landed the role of June Forsyte in the ITV1 adaptation of John Galsworthy's classic novel The Forsyte Saga. She later reprised the role for the second series. Following the success of The Forsyte Saga, Kearney's next role brought her back onto the ITV screen in its newest medical drama, Sweet Medicine. Kearney was cast as Dr Deborah "Deb" Sweet, and starred alongside Jason Merrells, who played her husband, and Patricia Hodge as her formidable mother-in-law. The show was intended to take up the mantle of the popular rural drama Peak Practice, which had recently ended, but low viewing figures saw Sweet Medicine axed after just one series.

In 2005, Kearney landed a role in Channel 4's hit series Shameless, playing the role of Marty Fisher's (Jack Deam) girlfriend, Sue Garland. She left the show along with her on-screen partner in 2007. She had a number of television roles following her departure before landing the role of Jessica Harrison in Casualty, in January 2008. Kearney left Casualty in February 2010, but returned briefly to tie up the loose ends of her character's storyline in May 2010.

As of 2 January 2015, Kearney began appearing in the ITV soap opera Emmerdale, in the role of Emma Barton, the estranged wife of James Barton (Bill Ward) and mother of their three sons Pete (Anthony Quinlan), Ross (Michael Parr) and Finn (Joe Gill). Kearney has received critical acclaim for her performance, particularly when it came to the "No Return" week which saw the character hold James hostage and cause a huge crash that endangered the lives of seven Emmerdale residents; after Emma accidentally pushed James off the bridge, he later died. Kearney was nominated for Best Serial Drama Performance at the 2016 National Television Awards. In 2019, Kearney directed the 5Star woman's prison drama Clink.

Personal life
Kearney lived in Crouch End, North London, from July 2000, and then rented a property in Clifton, Bristol, during her time appearing in Casualty. She returned to live in Liverpool after the birth of her son; she also rented a home in Yorkshire where she filmed Emmerdale, and a holiday home on the Atlantic coast of County Clare, Ireland.

In April 2009 Kearney mentioned, during a This Morning television interview, that she was seeing a final-year medical student called Eddie, whom she had met whilst in Bristol. Early in 2010, Kearney announced her engagement to Eddie Foo and their intention to marry later that year in Ireland, but the plans were soon put on hold when she discovered that she was expecting their first child. Kearney gave birth to an 8 lb 3 oz (3.7 kg) baby boy on 26 August 2010.

Credits

Film

Television

Theatre
 Macbeth ... Lady Macduff, Witch; Everyman Theatre, Liverpool; 6 May – 11 June 2011
 Strangers, Babies ... May; Traverse Theatre, Edinburgh;  23 February – 17 March 2007
 The Flint Street Nativity ... Mary; Playhouse Theatre, Liverpool; 7 December 2006 – 20 January 2007
 Hedda Gabler ... Hedda Gabler
 Playhouse Theatre, Liverpool; 23 March – 15 April 2006
 West Yorkshire Playhouse (Quarry Theatre), Leeds; 17 February – 11 March 2006
 A Man of Principle ... Ruth; Colin's Bridewell, Liverpool; 26 October 2004
 A Midsummer Night's Dream ... Hermia; Albery Theatre, London; 16 March – 12 May 2001
 King Lear ... Cordelia; Royal Exchange Theatre, Manchester; 9 September – 23 October 1999
 The School for Wives ... Agnès
 Comedy Theatre, London; 6 May – 2 August 1997
 Piccadilly Theatre, London; 11 February – 26 April 1997
 Theatre Royal, Bath; 9–14 December 1996
 Festival Theatre, Chichester; 26–30 November 1996
 Tyne Theatre and Opera House, Newcastle upon Tyne; 18–23 November 1996
 Richmond Theatre, Richmond; 11–16 November 1996
 King's Theatre, Edinburgh; 5–9 November 1996
 Thorndike Theatre, Leatherhead; 8–26 October 1996
 The Rivals ... Lucy; Royal Exchange Theatre, Manchester; 8 February – 23 March 1996
 When We Are Married ... Nancy Holmes; Festival Theatre, Chichester; 24 July – 17 August 1996
 The School for Scandal ... Maria; Everyman Theatre, Liverpool; 1992
 Othello ... Desdemona; Everyman Theatre, Liverpool; 1992
 Alice in Wonderland ... Alice; Everyman Theatre, Liverpool; 1991
 The White Devil ... Giovanni; Everyman Theatre, Liverpool; 1991
 Your Home in the West ... Sharon; Royal Exchange Theatre, Manchester; 28 March – 13 April 1991

Radio

Awards and nominations

References

External links
 

1972 births
Living people
Actresses from Liverpool
Alumni of Rose Bruford College
English child actresses
English television actresses
English soap opera actresses
English stage actresses
English film actresses
English radio actresses
English Shakespearean actresses
20th-century English actresses
21st-century English actresses